The Manitoban is the official student newspaper at the University of Manitoba in Winnipeg, Manitoba. Published for the first time on November 5, 1914, the Toban, as it is called for short, is one of the oldest and largest (by circulation and budget) student newspapers in Canada.

The tabloid-sized paper is published monthly during the summer and every Wednesday during the regular Fall-Winter university session. The Manitoban is non-profit and is completely owned and operated by students.

During the fall and winter 10,000 copies of the Manitoban are printed on a weekly basis, and distributed extensively on both campuses of the University of Manitoba and throughout Winnipeg.

Notable past contributors include Marshall McLuhan,  Marcel Dzama, Andrew Coyne, Nahlah Ayed, Graham Spry and Izzy Asper.

Editors-in-chief

The Manitoban starts advertising for the position of editor-in-chief (EiC) each February, and normally hires for the position at the beginning of March. EiCs are hired for a term position of 54 weeks, from May 1 to May 14, with the overlap intended to be used for the outgoing EiC to train their replacement.

EiCs are chosen by the Hiring Committee, made up of the paper's Editorial Board and two non-editor staff members. The hiring process consists of a written application, an editing test and an intensive in-person interview.

EiCs may hold the position for two consecutive years, but must be rehired by the Hiring Committee after their first term. Despite funding from the general student population, students who are not on the paper's staff do not participate in the selection of EiC.

The EiC is the head of the Manitoban and is responsible for organizing, editing and approving the paper's content. They are also tasked, in cooperation with the Business Manager, with hiring the staff each year. In addition to these responsibilities, the EiC is the chair of the Editorial Board and the president of the Manitoban Newspaper Publications Corporation.

Current and past EICs

 Gillian Brown – current EiC
 Ty Brass – 2021-22
 Matthew Doering – 2020–21
 Malak Abas – 2019–20
 Garett Williams – 2017–19
 Craig Adolphe – 2015–17
 Fraser Nelund – 2014–15
 Bryce Hoye – 2013–14
 Ryan Harby – 2012–13
 Leif Larsen – 2010–12
 Kevin Doole – 2009–10
 Tessa Vanderhart – 2007-09
 Carson Jerema – 2006-07
 Regan Sarmatiuk – 2005-06
 Joel Trenaman – 2004-05
 Bernice Pontanilla – 2001-02
 Phil Koch – 2000-01
 Kevin Matthews – 1999-00
 Ed Janzen – 1997-99
 Matt Lazowski – 1996-97
 Jeff Oliver – 1996-96
 Jeff Zuk – 1994-95
 Alayne Armstrong – 1991-92
 Paul Hayward – 1990-91
 Eric Bertam – 1989-90
 Elizabeth Bricknell – 1988-89
 Mark Mignacca – 1987–1988

Editorial board

The Manitoban's editorial board meets on a weekly basis during the publishing season, deems what is fit to print in the paper and debates issues of policy. It is made up of editors, and two temporary members of the non editorial staff who are rotated out after three representatives meetings. The EiC is the chair of the editorial board, but only votes in the event of a tie.

See also
 List of student newspapers in Canada
 List of newspapers in Canada

References

External links
 The Manitoban

Student newspapers published in Manitoba
University of Manitoba
Canadian University Press
Publications established in 1914
1914 establishments in Manitoba